José Álvaro Barco Andrade (born 27 June 1967) is a former Peruvian international footballer who played for clubs in Peru and Chile.

Playing career

Club
Born in Lima, Peru, Barco began playing youth football with local side Universitario de Deportes. He played collegiate soccer for Long Island University in the United States with his brother Fernando. He returned to Peru to play professionally with Universitario, as well as C.D. Palestino and Cobreloa in Chile. He also had brief spells with Mexican side Tampico Madero in 1994-95 season and a club in China.

International
Barco made 30 appearances for the Peru national football team from 1986 to 1997. He participated in the 1991 Copa América and the 1993 Copa América in Ecuador.

Managerial career
Following his playing career, he became a manager, leading Universitario de Deportes and Universidad San Martín de Porres.

References

External links
 
 
 
 

1967 births
Living people
Footballers from Lima
Association football defenders
Peruvian footballers
Peruvian expatriate footballers
Peru international footballers
1991 Copa América players
1993 Copa América players
Peruvian Primera División players
Chilean Primera División players
Liga MX players
Club Universitario de Deportes footballers
Cobreloa footballers
Club Deportivo Palestino footballers
Tampico Madero F.C. footballers
Expatriate footballers in Chile
Expatriate footballers in Mexico